Arménio Ferreira is a former Angolan physician of Portuguese descent. Ferreira was the personal physician and unofficial advisor of Angolan President Agostinho Neto.

References

Year of birth missing
Possibly living people
Angolan physicians